National Safe Place (doing business as National Safe Place Network) is a non-profit organization based out of Louisville, Kentucky. It originated in 1983 from an initiative known as "Project Safe Place", established by a short-term residential and counseling center for youth 12 to 17. The organization is intended to provide access to immediate help and support for children and adolescents who are "at risk" or in crisis situations. The purpose is to both defuse a potential crisis situation as well as provide immediate counsel and support so the child in crisis may be directed to an appropriate shelter or accredited care facility.

Businesses and community buildings such as fire stations and libraries are designated as "Safe Place" sites. Any youth in crisis can walk into one of the nearly 20,000 Safe Places across the country and ask an employee for help. These locations display the yellow, diamond-shaped Safe Place sign on their location. Inside, employees are trained and prepared to assist any young person asking for help. Youth who go to a Safe Place location are quickly connected to the nearby youth shelter. The shelter then provides the counseling and support necessary to reunify family members and develop a plan to address the issues presented by the youth and family.

In October 2009, National Safe Place launched the TXT 4 HELP initiative, which provides youth immediate access to help and resources through texting. Youth can text the word "safe" and their current location (address/city/state) to 4HELP (44357) and receive an immediate text response with the location of the closest Safe Place site or youth shelter and the youth shelter phone number. If a site or shelter is not within a 50-mile range, the youth receives the number to the National Runaway Safeline (1-800-RUNAWAY). In 2012, National Safe Place added the option for live, interactive texting with a trained mental health professional. With this addition, youth can immediately connect with Master's-level mental health professionals by text.

In 2013, National Safe Place merged with the Youth & Family Services Network (YFSN) to create the National Safe Place Network. NSPN provides training and technical assistance to licensed Safe Place agencies and NSPN member organizations across the country. More information about NSPN is available at www.nspnetwork.org.

The National Safe Place Network also operates the Runaway and Homeless Youth Training and Technical Assistance Center (RHYTTAC), a national training resource for FYSB-funded Runaway and Homeless Youth grantees, as well as several other federally funded projects focused on human trafficking and other issues critical to youth service providers.

See also

 Block Parent Program (Canada)
Safety House Program (Australia)
The first Safe Place case was in 1983 in Louisville Ky. At firehouse at 6th and Hill St
Facilitated by then Sergeant Matthew L Kaelin.  Fire Co. Truck 3

References

External links

Child safety
Children's rights organizations in the United States
Non-profit organizations based in Louisville, Kentucky
Safety organizations